This is a list of patron saints of places by nation, region, and town or city. If a place is not listed here, it may be listed in "Patronage of the Blessed Virgin Mary".

Continents

Regions

Countries 

This list only includes sovereign states. Subdivisions, such as the constituent countries of the United Kingdom, are listed below under "Administrative subdivisions".

Former states 
  Gregory the Miracle-Worker and Saint Gregory after 1461.
  Andrew the Apostle
  Adalbert of Prague, John of Nepomuk, Ludmila, Cyril and Methodius, Wenceslas
  Willibrord
Medieval Livonia  Theotokos
  Nicholas of Myra
  Petar I Petrović Njegoš
  Petar I Petrović Njegoš
  Adalbert of Prague, Dorothy of Montau, Jutta of Kulmsee, Andrew the Apostle
  John of Suceava
  Vitus
  Cyril and Methodius
  Saint George
  Saint Ambrose
  Saint Mark, Theodore
  Saint Blaise
  Maurice

Administrative subdivisions

Cities and towns 

Argentina
Junín  Ignatius of Loyola
Mar del Plata  Cecilia
Australia
Brisbane  Mary MacKillop
Melbourne  Patrick
Perth  William of Rochester
Sydney  Mary MacKillop

Austria
Graz  Giles
Linz  Florian
Salzburg  Rupert of Salzburg, Vergilius
Vienna  Clemens Maria Hofbauer

Belarus
Grodno  Francis Xavier

Bangladesh
Dinajpur  Francis Xavier

Belgium
Affligem  Michael
Anderlecht  Guy of Anderlecht
Antwerp  Walburga
Brecht  Michael
Bruges  Andrew the Apostle
Brussels  Gudula, Michael
Ghent  Bavo, Macarius of Antioch, Pharaildis
Lier  Gummarus
Mons  Waltrude
Oudenarde  Walburga
Temse  Amalberga

Bosnia and Herzegovina
Grude  St. Catherine of Alexandria

Brazil
Brasília  John Bosco
Ribeirão Preto  Sebastian
Taquaritinga  Sebastian
Rio de Janeiro  Sebastian
São Paulo  Paul the Apostle
Belo Horizonte  Our Lady of Good Voyage, Ignatius of Loyola
Jaboticabal  Our Lady of Mount Carmel
Uberlândia  Our Lady of Abbey
Niterói  John the Baptist
Vitória  Our Lady of Victory
Paraty  Virgin of Los Remedios
Arraial do Cabo  Virgin of Los Remedios

Canada
Calgary  Demetrios
Deschambault, Quebec  Joseph
Halifax  John The Baptist
Ottawa  Humbert of Maroilles
St. John's, Newfoundland and Labrador  John the Baptist
Toronto  Michael
Vancouver  Our Lady of the Rosary
Winnipeg  Boniface

Colombia
 Barranquilla  Nicholas of Tolentino, Saint Roch
 Bogotá  Elizabeth of Hungary
 Bucaramanga  Immaculate Conception
 Buenaventura  Bonaventure
 Cali  James the Greater
 Cartagena  Peter Claver
 Cúcuta  Saint Joseph
 El Guamo  Saint Lucy
 Envigado  Gertrude the Great
 Ibagué  Saint Boniface
 Ipiales  Our Lady of Las Lajas
 Medellín  Virgin of Candelaria and Lawrence of Rome
 Mocoa  Michael
 Montería  Jerome
 Neiva  Immaculate Conception
 Pasto  Virgin of Mercy and John the Baptist
 Popayán  Ecce homo
 Santa Fe de Antioquia  Saint Barbara
 Santa Marta  Martha
 Soacha  Bernardino of Siena
 Tunja  James the Greater
 Valledupar  Ecce homo

Croatia
Dubrovnik  Blaise
Losinj  Gaudentius of Ossero
Rab  Christopher
Rijeka  Vitus
Šibenik  Michael
Sisak  Quirinus
Split  Duje
Zadar  St. Chrysogonus
Zagreb  Mary, Francis Xavier

Cuba
Caraballo  Paul the Apostle's Conversion
Havana, Cuba  Christopher

Czech Republic
Brandýs nad Labem-Stará Boleslav  Wenceslas
Brušperk  George
Březnice  Vitus
Brno  Saint Primitivus and Saint Constantius
České Budějovice  Saint Auratianus
Český Brod  Gotthard of Hildesheim
Dobřany  Vitus
Frenštát pod Radhoštěm  Martin of Tours
Hradec Králové  Clement of Rome
Chomutov  Michael
Nepomuk  John of Nepomuk
Olomouc  Pavlína Římská
Písek  Pope Pius V
Plzeň  Bartholomew
Polná  Saint Ligorius
Prague  John of Nepomuk, Wenceslas
Sázava  Procopius of Sázava

Denmark
Odense  Saint Alban
Slagelse  Michael
Aarhus  Saint Clement of Rome

Ecuador
Guayaquil  James the Greater
Loja  Sebastian
Quito  Francis of Assisi

Egypt
Alexandria  Cyril of Alexandria

France
Abbeville  Wulfram of Sens
Albi  Cecilia
Autun  Symphorian
Avignon  Agricola of Avignon, Benezet
Baume-les-Messieurs, Fleury-sur-Loire  Drogo
Besançon  Ferreolus and Ferrutio
Dijon  Benignus of Dijon, Urban of Langres
Saint-Fiacre  Fiacre
Gap, Hautes-Alpes  Arnulph
Limoges  Martial
Lourdes  Bernadette of Lourdes
Orléans  Joan of Arc
Paris  Denis, Genevieve
Ploërmel   Saint Armel
Plourin  Budoc
Saint-Sève  Severus of Vienne
Toulouse  Saturnin
Tours  Gatianus of Tours, Martin of Tours
Vannes  Paternus

Germany
Aachen  Mary, Matthias
Augsburg  Afra, Ulric
Berlin  Saint Peter, Otto of Bamberg, Hedwig of Silesia
Bonn  Cassius of Narni, Adelaide
Bremen  Oscar
Brunswick  Andrew, Blaise, Christopher
Cologne  Cunibert, Ursula
Dresden  Benno
Düsseldorf  Apollinaris of Ravenna
Dormagen  Michael
Hamburg  Oscar
Hanover  Matthias
Frankfurt am Main  Helen
Freiburg im Breisgau  George
Freising  Francis Xavier
Koblenz  Mary
Konstanz  Pelagius of Constance
Lübeck  Nicholas
Mainz  Alban of Mainz, Boniface
Munich  Benno
Münster  Ludger of Utrecht
Nuremberg  Sebaldus
Regensburg  Wolfgang, Emmeram
Stuttgart  Christopher
Trier  Maximinus, Peter
Würzburg  Burchard of Würzburg
Zeitz  Michael

Greece
Agios Nikolaos, Crete  Nicholas
Athens  Dionysius the Areopagite
Cephallonia  Gerasimus of Cephallonia
Corfu  Arsenius of Corfu, Spyridon
Corinth  Dionysius of Corinth
Heraklion  Menas
Katerini  St. Catherine of Alexandria
Larissa  Achillius of Larissa
Lefkada  Spyridon
Patras  Andrew
Piraeus  Spyridon
Skiathos  Mary
Skopelos  Riginos
Sparta  Nikon the Metanoeite
Syros  Nicholas
Thessaloniki  Demetrius of Thessaloniki
Tinos  Pelagia
Zakynthos  Dionysios of Zakynthos

Haiti
Port-au-Prince  Our Lady of the Assumption
Cap-Haïtien  Our Lady of the Assumption
Les Cayes  Our Lady of the Assumption
Jacmel  James the Less, Philip the Apostle

Hungary
Budapest  Peter the Apostle
Dunakeszi  Michael
Győr  Sebastian
Szentendre  Andrew

India
Agartala  Francis Xavier
Ahmedabad  Francis Xavier
Bengaluru  Francis Xavier
Bombay  Francis Xavier, Gonsalo Garcia
Calcutta  Saint Teresa of Calcutta
Kollam  Francis Xavier
Kottar  Francis Xavier
Madras  St.George
Goa  Francis Xavier, Joseph Vaz
Sivagangai  John de Britto

Ireland
Clonmacnoise  Ciaran the Younger
Cloyne  Colman of Cloyne
Cork  Finbarr
Dublin  Laurence O'Toole
Fahan  Mura
Ferns  Aeden of Ferns
Kilbarry/Tarmonbarry  Saint Berach
Kilmallock, County Limerick  Mochelloc
Limerick  Munchin
Ross  Fachanan

Italy
Abruzzi  Saint Gabriel of Our Lady of Sorrows
Amalfi  Andrew the Apostle
Ancona  Judas Cyriacus
Aosta  Gratus of Aosta
Aquila  Maximus of Aquila
Assisi  Francis of Assisi
Bari  Nicholas, Sabinus
Benevento  Arthelais, Barbatus of Benevento
Bergamo  Alexander of Bergamo
Bologna  Saint Petronius
Brescia  Faustinus and Jovita
Brindisi  Lawrence of Brindisi
Caltanissetta  Michael
Capriate San Gervasio  Alexander of Bergamo
Castellabate  Constabilis
Castelplanio  Joseph
Catania  Agatha, Aloysius Gonzaga
Cervignano d'Adda  Alexander of Bergamo
Como  Abundius
Craco  Vincenzo Martyr
Cuneo  Michael
Fabriano  Adrian of Nicomedia
Ferrara  George
Florence  John the Baptist, Joseph, Zenobius
Fonte Nuova  Joseph
Genoa  George, John the Baptist, Syrus of Genoa
Grosseto  Adrian and Natalia of Nicomedia
Imperia  Leonard of Port Maurice
La Spezia  Joseph
Ladispoli  Joseph
Lecce  Bernardino Realino
Lecco  Nicholas
Macchia Valfortore  Nicholas
Matelica  Adrian and Natalia of Nicomedia
Messina  Aloysius Gonzaga
Milan  Ambrose
Modica, Sicily  George
Naples  Agnellus, Aloysius Gonzaga, Alphonsus Maria de Liguori, Andrew Avellino, James of the Marches, Januarius, John IV, Bishop of Naples, Patricia of Naples
Nocera Inferiore  
Nocera Umbra  Raynald of Nocera
Orvieto  Joseph
Otranto  Antonio Primaldo and his Companion Martyrs
Pagani, Campania  Our Lady of the Hens, Alphonsus Liguori
Palermo  Agatha of Sicily, Benedict the Black, Rosalia
Pavia, Italy  Syrus of Pavia (Siro), Theodore of Pavia
Padua  Anthony of Padua
Pescia  Abdon and Sennen
Pisa  Rainerius
Ponza  Silverius
Querceta, Seravezza   Joseph
Randazzo  Joseph
Reggio Calabria  George
Reggio Emilia  Prosper of Reggio
Ripacandida  Donatus
Rome  Lawrence, Martina of Rome, Philip Neri, Paul, Peter, Sebastian, Ignatius of Loyola
Sant'Agata de' Goti  Alphonsus Maria de Liguori
Salerno  Matthew the Apostle
Siena  Ansanus the Baptizer, Ambrose Sansedoni of Siena
Sorrento  Antoninus of Sorrento
Spadafora  Joseph
Syracuse  Lucy of Syracuse
Taranto  Catald
Trapani  Albert of Trapani
Trieste  Justus of Trieste
Turin  John the Baptist, Joseph, Maximus of Turin, Octavius, Solutor
Urbino  Crescentinus
Venice  Mark the Evangelist George, Theodore of Amasea
Veroli  Mary Salome
Verona  Zeno of Verona
Volperino, Foligno  Maro

Kenya
Kisumu  Thérèse of Lisieux

Lebanon
Beirut  George
Zahlé  Prophet Elias
Zgharta  Virgin Mary, Saydet Zgharta

Lithuania
Kaunas  Nicholas
Vilnius  Antony of Vilnius, Christopher, Eustace of Vilnius, John of Vilnius

Madagascar
Antananarivo  Joseph
Antsiranana  Francis Xavier

Malta
Birgu  Lawrence
Birkirkara   Anthony of Padua, Saint Helena, Joseph, Our Lady of Mount Carmel
Birzebbugia  Peter
Isla  Santa Maria Bambina, Christ the Redeemer
Kalkara  Joseph
Luqa  Andrew
Marsaskala  Anne
Mdina  Paul the Apostle's Conversion
Msida  Joseph
Qala  Joseph
Qormi  Saint George
Siġġiewi  Nicholas
Ta' Xbiex  St. John of the Cross
Valletta  Saint Augustine, Saint Dominic, Our Lady of Mount Carmel, Paul the Apostle
Victoria, Gozo  George
Xewkija, Gozo  John the Baptist
Zejtun  Catherine of Alexandria
Zurrieq  Catherine of Alexandria

Mexico
Cuauhtitlan  Juan Diego
Mexico City  Our Lady Of Guadalupe, Philip Of Jesus
Santiago de Querétaro  James the Greater

Montenegro
Bar  Jovan Vladimir

The Netherlands
Aalsum  St. Catherine of Alexandria 
Alkmaar  Lawrence
Amersfoort  George
Amsterdam  Nicholas
Dordrecht  Mary
Gouda  John the Baptist
Groningen  Walburga, Martin of Tours
Haarlem  Bavo
Kerkrade  Barbara
Maastricht  Amand of Maastricht
Nijmegen  Stephen
The Hague  Gabriel
Utrecht  Martin of Tours
Winschoten  Vitus
Zutphen  Walburga

Nicaragua
Managua  Christopher

Norway
Oslo  Hallvard

Peru
Cusco  Anthony of Padua, Sebastian
Piura  John Bosco
Pucallpa  Sebastian

Philippines

Abuyog  Francis Xavier
Alegria  Francis Xavier
Antipolo, Rizal  Our Lady of Peace and Good Voyage, St. Thérèse of Lisieux
Arayat  St. Catherine of Alexandria
Bagac  St. Catherine of Alexandria
Baguio, Benguet  Our Lady of Atonement
Bantay, Ilocos Sur  Saint Augustine, Our Lady of Charity
Batangas  Joseph The Patriarch, Our Lady of Casaysay
Borbon, Cebu  Sebastian
Bulacan  Saint Paschal Baylon, Saint Claire Of Assisi, Our Lady Of Salambao, Our Lady Of Queen And Patroness Of Paombong 
Cabatuan, Iloilo  Nicholas of Tolentino
Cabuyao, Laguna  Polycarp, Joseph The Worker
Cagayan de Oro  Augustine of Hippo
Calatagan, Batangas  Dominic of Silos
Calamba, Laguna  John The Baptist
Caloocan  Roch
Carcar  St. Catherine of Alexandria
Catbalogan  Philip Neri
Cavite  Our Lady of Solitude of Porta Vaga, Our Lady of the Pillar
Cebu  Our Lady of Guadalupe, Pedro Calungsod
Davao  Peter The Apostle
Dumaguete  St. Catherine of Alexandria
Gerona  St. Catherine of Alexandria
Las Piñas  Joseph
Laguna  James The Apostle
Leon  St. Catherine of Alexandria
Lumban  Sebastian 
Makati  Saints Peter and Paul the Apostles, Our Lady of Guadalupe
Malabon  Saint Bartholomew, Immaculate Conception
Mandaluyong  Philip Neri, Dominic Savio
Manila  The Immaculate Conception, Lorenzo Ruiz, Virgin of Montserrat
Marikina  Our Lady of the Abandoned
Muntinlupa  Our Lady of the Abandoned
Naga City  Our Lady of Peñafrancia
Nasugbu  Francis Xavier
Obando, Bulacan  Our Lady of Salambao, Pascal Baylon, Claire of Assisi
Pagbilao  St. Catherine of Alexandria
Pampanga  Our Lady Of Virgen De Los Remedios
Parañaque  Andrew The Apostle, Our Lady of Good Event, Mary Help Of Christians
Pasay  Claire of Assisi, Thérèse of Lisieux
Pasig  Immaculate Conception
Pateros  Martha, Roch
Porac  St. Catherine of Alexandria
Quezon City  Our Lady of La Naval de Manila
Quezon  Isidore Labrador
Rizal  Our Lady Of Peace And Good Voyage, Saint Clement of Rome
Santa  St. Catherine of Alexandria
Santa Catalina  St. Catherine of Alexandria
Santa Catalina  St. Catherine of Alexandria
San Juan  John the Baptist
San Marcelino, Zambales  Isidore the Laborer
Santa Teresita, Batangas  Thérèse of Lisieux
Sulat, Eastern Samar  Ignatius of Loyola 
Surigao City  Nicholas of Tolentino
Taal, Batangas  Martin of Tours
Tagaytay, Cavite  Our Lady Of Lourdes
Taguig  Anne
Tagum  Christ the King
Tandag  Nicholas of Tolentino
Tayum  St. Catherine of Alexandria
Zambales  Augustine of Hippo

Poland
Bydgoszcz  Martin of Tours
Cracow  Faustina, Stanislaus of Szczepanów
Częstochowa  Mary
Łódź  Faustina
Poznań  Paul, Peter
Warsaw  Andrew Bobola, Faustina, Władysław of Gielniów
Wrocław  John the Baptist

Portugal
Funchal  James the Less, Saint Roch
Lisbon  Anthony of Lisbon, Vincent of Saragossa
Porto  John the Baptist
Póvoa de Varzim  Peter
Setubal  Francis Xavier

Romania
Bucharest, Romania  Demetrius of Basarab
Curtea de Argeș – Nicholas, Philophteia
Iași – Parascheva of the Balkans, George
Oradea - Ladislaus I of Hungary
Sfântu Gheorghe  George
Suceava – John of Suceava, George

Russia
Arkhangelsk  Michael (archangel)
Murom  Peter and Fevronia
Moscow  Boris, George, Saint Peter of Moscow
Pskov  Vsevolod of Pskov
Saint Petersburg  Peter, Xenia
Samara  Alexius of Moscow

Rwanda
Kigali  Stephen

Serbia
Belgrade  Jesus (as the Holy Saviour) and Demetrius
Sremska Mitrovica  Demetrius and Methodius
Kragujevac  George
Leskovac  Holy Trinity
Niš  Procopius
Novi Sad  George
Prizren  George
Arilje  Achillius
Požarevac  Holy Trinity
Svilajnac  Constantine, Helena

Slovakia
Kysucké Nové Mesto  James, son of Alphaeus
Nitra  Andrew Zorard
Svätý Jur  George

Slovenia
Celje  Maximilian of Lorch
Koper  Nazarius of Koper
Ljubljana  George
Maribor  John the Baptist
Ptuj  George

South Africa
Cape Town  Francis Xavier
Witbank  Thérèse of Lisieux

Spain
Alcalá de Henares  Justus, Pastor
Andalusia  Saint Luke
Barakaldo  Our Lady of Mount Carmel, Vincent of Saragossa
Barcelona  Eulalia, Raymond of Penyafort
Calahorra  Emeterius and Celedonius
Candeleda  Bernard of Valdeiglesias
Cartagena  Modestus
Cordoba  Acisclus
Extremadura  Peter of Alcantara
Granada, Spain  Caecilius of Elvira
Jaén  Saint Luke
Las Palmas de Gran Canaria (Canary Islands)  Anne
Madrid  Eustace, Isidore the Farmer, Justus, Pastor
Mallorca  Alphonsus Rodriguez -
Sahagun  Abdon
San Cristóbal de La Laguna (Canary Islands)  Christopher
Santa Cruz de Tenerife (Canary Islands)  James the Greater
Santander   Emeterius and Celedonius
Santiago de Compostela  James the Greater
Segovia  St. John of the Cross
Sestao  Peter
Seville, Spain  Ferdinand III of Castile, Justa
Toledo  Leocadia
Valencia  Vincent Martyr
Zamarramala  Agatha of Sicily

Sri Lanka
Colombo  Lawrence
Negombo  Sebastian

Sweden
Stockholm  Eric of Sweden
Växjö  Sigfrid of Sweden
Tanzania
Dodoma  Stephen
Turkey
Antioch  Barnabas
Constantinople  John Chrysostom, Constantine the Great, George
Smyrna  Polycarp

Syria
Damascus  John of Damascus

Ukraine
Kyiv  Michael

United Kingdom
Aberdeen  Machar, Nicholas, Our Lady of Aberdeen
Abingdon-on-Thames  Edmund of Abingdon, Helen
Bampton, Oxfordshire  Beornwald
Bodmin  Petroc
Boston  Botulph
Bristol  Jordan of Bristol
Buckingham  Rumwold
Caerleon  Cadog
Canterbury  Augustine of Canterbury, Thomas Becket
Cardiff  Teilo, Piran
Chester  Werburgh
Chichester  Richard of Chichester
Colchester  Helen of Constantinople
Crowland  Guthlac
Derby  Alcmund of Derby
Dorchester-on-Thames  Birinus
Droitwich  Richard of Chichester
Dumfries  Michael
Dundee  Mary
Durham  Cuthbert of Lindisfarne
Edinburgh  Giles
Ely  Etheldreda
Exeter  Sidwell 
Glasgow  Kentigern, Theneva
Greenwich  Alfege
Hereford  Thomas Cantilupe
Holywell  Winifred
Jarrow  Bede
Leicester  Martin of Tours
Lichfield  Chad of Mercia
Lincoln  Mary, Hugh of Lincoln
Linlithgow  Michael
Liverpool  Nicholas
Llandeilo Fawr  Teilo
Llantwit Major  Illtud
London  Erkenwald, George, Mellitus, Michael, Paul the Apostle
Malmesbury  Aldhelm
Northampton  Crispin
Newport  Gwynllyw the Bearded
Oxford  Frideswide
Padstow  Piran
Paisley  Mirin, James the Greater, Our Lady of Paisley
Perranporth  Piran
Perth  John the Baptist
Portsmouth  Thomas Becket, Nicholas
Preston, Lancashire  St Wilfrid
Reading  James the Greater
Ripon  Wilfrid
St. Albans  Alban
St Andrews  Andrew
St. Brides Wentloog  Brigit of Kildare
St. Davids  David (Dewi Sant)
St. Helier, Jersey  Helier
St. Peter Port, Guernsey  Peter
Salisbury  Osmund
Shrewsbury  Winifred
Stafford  Beorhthelm
Steyning  Cuthman
Sunderland  Benedict Biscop
Tyne and Wear  Bede
Winchcombe  Kenelm
Winchester  Swithun
Worcester  Oswald of Worcester, Wulfstan
Wrexham  Richard Gwyn
York  Peter, William of York

United States
Acoma Pueblo  James the Greater
Arlington, Virginia  Thomas More
Baltimore, Maryland  Immaculate Conception
Boston, Massachusetts  Patrick
Cheyenne, Wyoming  Thérèse of Lisieux
Detroit, Michigan  Anne
Fresno, California  Thérèse of Lisieux
Green Bay, Wisconsin  Francis Xavier
Indianapolis, Indiana  Francis Xavier
Joliet, Illinois  Francis Xavier
Kalamazoo, Michigan  Augustine of Hippo
Key West, Florida  Francis Xavier
Las Vegas, Nevada  Paul the Apostle
Los Angeles, California Our Lady, Queen of Angels
New Orleans, Louisiana  Joan of Arc
New York City  Nicholas
Pueblo, Colorado  Thérèse of Lisieux
Ruskin, Florida  Anne
Saint Augustine, Florida  Augustine of Hippo
Saint Paul, Minnesota  Paul the Apostle
San Antonio, Texas  Anthony of Padua
San Diego, California  Didacus of Alcalá
San Francisco, California  Francis of Assisi
Santa Fe, New Mexico  Francis of Assisi
Santa Rosa, California  Rose of Lima
Seattle, Washington  James the Greater
St. Augustine, Florida  Augustine of Hippo
St. Louis, Missouri  Louis
Superior, Wisconsin  Augustine of Hippo
Taos, New Mexico  Anne, John the Apostle
Thibodaux, Louisiana  Valeria of Milan
Tucson, Arizona  Augustine of Hippo

Archdioceses and dioceses

Europe
Belgium
Archdiocese of Mechelen-Brussels — Rumbold of Mechlin
Diocese of Antwerp — Ignatius of Loyola
Czech Republic
Archdiocese of Olomouc — Wenceslaus (primary), Cyril and Methodius, Pięciu Braci Męczenników, Adalbert of Prague, Vitus, Procopius of Sázava, Święta Kordula, Ludmila, Pavlína Římská
Archdiocese of Prague — Adalbert of Prague (primary), Vitus, John of Nepomuk, Wenceslaus
France
Metropolitan Archdiocese of Besançon — Immaculate Conception
Metropolitan Archdiocese of Bordeaux — Andrew the Apostle
Metropolitan Archdiocese of Clermont — Austromoine
Metropolitan Archdiocese of Dijon — Benignus of Dijon
Metropolitan Archdiocese of Lille — Notre Dame de la Treille
Metropolitan Archdiocese of Lyon — Irenaeus, Saint Pothinus
Metropolitan Archdiocese of Marseille — Lazarus of Bethany
Metropolitan Archdiocese of Montpellier — Saint Peter, Paul the Apostle
Metropolitan Archdiocese of Paris — Saint Denis of Paris, Genevieve
Metropolitan Archdiocese of Poitiers — Hilary of Poitiers
Metropolitan Archdiocese of Reims — Saint Remigius
Metropolitan Archdiocese of Rennes — Saint Peter
Metropolitan Archdiocese of Rouen — Assumption of Mary
Metropolitan Archdiocese of Toulouse — Saint Stephen
Metropolitan Archdiocese of Tours — Gatianus of Tours, St. Martin of Tours
Archdiocese of Aix — Maximinus of Aix
Archdiocese of Albi — Saint Cecilia
Archdiocese of Auch — Nativity of Mary
Archdiocese of Avignon — Mary, mother of Jesus, Agricola of Avignon
Archdiocese of Bourges — Ursinus of Bourges
Archdiocese of Cambrai — Gaugericus
Archdiocese of Chambéry-Saint-Jean-de-Maurienne-Tarentaise — John the Baptist, Saint Peter, Paul the Apostle, Francis de Sales
Archdiocese of Sens — Savinian and Potentian
Archdiocese of Strasbourg — Saint Arbogast
Germany
Archdiocese of Köln — Saint Joseph
Ireland (including Northern Ireland)
Archdiocese of Dublin — Kevin of Glendalough, Saint Laurence O'Toole
Archdiocese of Tuam — Iarlaithe mac Loga
Diocese of Limerick — Munchin
Diocese of Ossory — Ciaran the Elder
Italy (including Vatican City and San Marino)
Diocese of Nocera Inferiore-Sarno — 
Poland
Archdiocese of Kraków — Stanislaus of Cracow
Portugal
Patriarchate of Lisbon — Saint Vincent of Saragossa
Archdiocese of Braga — Martin of Braga (primary), Fructuosus of Braga, Gerald of Braga
Archdiocese of Évora — Immaculate Conception
Diocese of Funchal — James the Less (primary), Our Lady of the Mount
Archdiocese of Ljubljana — Cyril and Methodius
Archdiocese of Maribor — Andrew, Cyril and Methodius
Spain
Diocese of Jaca — Eurosia
Diocese of San Sebastián — Ignatius of Loyola

Americas
Canada
Metropolitan archdiocese of Edmonton — Saint Joseph
Metropolitan archdiocese of Gatineau — Mary, Mother of the Church
Metropolitan archdiocese of Grouard-McLennan — Martin of Tours
Metropolitan archdiocese of Kingston — Mary, mother of Jesus
Metropolitan archdiocese of Montréal — Mary, mother of Jesus
Metropolitan archdiocese of Ottawa — Saint Joseph
Metropolitan archdiocese of Québec — Saint Anne
Metropolitan archdiocese of Saint-Boniface — Saint Boniface
Metropolitan archdiocese of St. John's — John the Baptist
Metropolitan archdiocese of Toronto — St. Michael the Archangel
Metropolitan archdiocese of Vancouver — Our Lady of the Rosary
Archdiocese of Winnipeg — Saint Joseph
Diocese of Chicoutimi - Saint Francis Xavier
Diocese of Whitehorse - Saint Francis Xavier
Ukrainian Catholic Eparchy of Edmonton — Josaphat 
Ukrainian Orthodox Eparchy of Western Canada — John the Baptist
United States of America
Archdiocese of Anchorage — Saint Joseph
Archdiocese of Baltimore — Ignatius of Loyola
Archdiocese of Hartford — Saint Joseph
Archdiocese of Los Angeles — Vibiana
Archdiocese of Louisville — Saint Joseph
Archdiocese of New Orleans — Our Lady of Prompt Succor
Archdiocese of Omaha — Saint Cecilia
Archdiocese of Saint Louis — Louis IX of France
Archdiocese of San Francisco — Francis of Assisi
Archdiocese of Seattle — Saint James the Greater
Diocese of Bridgeport — Augustine of Hippo
Diocese of Green Bay — Francis Xavier
Diocese of Rochester — John Fisher
Diocese of Wheeling-Charleston — Saint Joseph

Asia
Bangladesh
Archdiocese of Dhaka — Immaculate Conception of the Blessed Virgin Mary
Archdiocese of Chittagong — Our Lady of the Rosary
India
Archdiocese of Agra — Our Lady of the Immaculate Conception
Archdiocese of Bangalore — St. Francis Xavier
Archdiocese of Bhopal — St. Francis of Assisi
Archdiocese of Bombay — St. Gonsalo Garcia, St. Francis Xavier
Archdiocese of Calcutta — St. Francis Xavier, St. Teresa of Calcutta
Archdiocese of Cuttack-Bhubaneswar — St. Joseph
Archdiocese of Delhi — Sacred Heart of Jesus
Archdiocese of Gandhinagar — Sacred Heart of Jesus, Our Lady Queen of the World
Archdiocese of Goa and Daman — St. Joseph Vaz
Archdiocese of Guwahati — Christ the Bearer of Good News
Archdiocese of Hyderabad — Saint Joseph
Archdiocese of Imphal — St. Joseph
Archdiocese of Madras and Mylapore — St. Thomas the Apostle
Archdiocese of Madurai — St. John de Brito
Archdiocese of Nagpur — St. Francise de Sales, Our Lady of Lourdes
Archdiocese of Patna — St. Joseph
Archdiocese of Pondicherry and Cuddalore — Our Lady of the Immaculate Conception
Archdiocese of Raipur — Mary Queen of the Apostles
Archdiocese of Ranchi — St. Francis Xavier
Archdiocese of Trivandrum — St. Therese of Lisieux
Archdiocese of Verapoly — Saint Joseph
Archdiocese of Visakhapatnam — St. Anne
Indonesia
Archdiocese of Medan — Bl. Denis and Redemptus
Kazakhstan
Archdiocese of Maria Santissima in Astana — Blessed Virgin Mary
Korea (Republic of Korea and Democratic People's Republic of Korea)
Archdiocese of Daegu — Our Lady of Lourdes, St. John Yi Yun-il
Archdiocese of Gwangju — St. Anselm of Canterbury
Archdiocese of Seoul — Blessed Virgin Mary
Macau
Diocese of Macau — St. Francis Xaveir, St. Catherine of Siena
Malaysia
Archdiocese of Kuala Lumpur — St. John the Evangelist
Archdiocese of Kota Kinabalu — Sacred Heart of Jesus, Immaculate Conception of the Blessed Virgin Mary
Archdiocese of Kuching — St. Joseph
Myanmar
Archdiocese of Mandalay — Sacred Heart of Jesus, Our Lady of the Rosary
Philippines
Archdiocese of Cáceres — St. Peter Baptist
Archdiocese of Cagayan de Oro — St. Augustine of Hippo, Our Lady of the Rosary
Archdiocese of Capiz — Our Lady of the Immaculate Conception
Archdiocese of Cebu — Our Lady of Guadalupe de Cebu, St. Vitalis of Milan, St. Pedro Calungsod
Archdiocese of Lipa — Saint Joseph, Saint Sebastian
Archdiocese of Manila — Immaculate Conception
Diocese of Bacolod — Saint Sebastian
Diocese of Dumaguete — St. Catherine of Alexandria
Diocese of Tarlac — Saint Sebastian
Diocese of Imus — Our Lady of the Pillar
Diocese of San Pablo —   Paul of Thebes
Sri Lanka
Archdiocese of Colombo — Assumption of Mary
Diocese of Anuradhapura — Saint Joseph
Diocese of Badulla — Blessed Virgin Mary
Diocese of Batticaloa — Our Lady of Presentation
Diocese of Chilaw — Our Lady of Mount Carmel
Diocese of Galle — Blessed Virgin Mary
Diocese of Jaffna — Immaculate Mother of God
Diocese of Kandy — Saint Anthony of Padua
Diocese of Kurunegala — Saint Anne
Diocese of Mannar — Our Lady of Madhu
Diocese of Ratnapura — Saint Peter, Saint Paul
Taiwan
Archdiocese of Taipei — Saint Joseph
Vietnam
Archdiocese of Hanoi — Saint Joseph

Oceania
Australia
Archdiocese of Adelaide — St. Patrick
Archdiocese of Brisbane — St. Mary MacKillop
Archdiocese of Canberra and Goulburn — Blessed Virgin Mary
Archdiocese of Hobart — St. Patrick
Archdiocese of Melbourne — St. Patrick
Archdiocese of Perth — Immaculate Conception of the Blessed Virgin Mary
Archdiocese of Sydney — Our Lady Help of Christians
Diocese of Wagga Wagga — Saint Mary MacKillop
New Zealand
Archdiocese of Wellington — Sacred Heart of Jesus, Blessed Virgin Mary

Africa
Algeria
Archdiocese of Alger — St. Cyprian
Angola
Archdiocese of Huambo — Our Lady of the Immaculate Conception
Cameroon
Archdiocese of Bamenda — St. Joseph
Ghana
Archdiocese of Accra — Immaculate Heart of Mary, St. Peter Claver, St. Martin de Porres, Martyrs of Uganda
Archdiocese of Cape Coast — Immaculate Heart of Mary
Archdiocese of Kumasi — St. Peter the Apostle
Archdiocese of Tamale — Our Lady of the Annunciation
Diocese of Malindi — Francis Xavier
Madagascar
Archdiocese of Antsiranana — Sacred Heart of Jesus
Malawi
Archdiocese of Blantyre — Mary Queen of All Hearts
Archdiocese of Lilongwe — Our Lady of Africa
Mozambique
Archdiocese of Nampula — Our Lady of Fatima
Nigeria
Archdiocese of Ibadan — St. Patrick
Sierra Leone
Archdiocese of Freetown and Bo — St. Edward the Confessor
South Africa
Archdiocese of Bloemfontein — Sacred Heart of Jesus
Archdiocese of Cape Town — St. Mary of the Flight into Egypt
Archdiocese of Johannesburg — Immaculate Conception of Our Lady
Archdiocese of Pretoria — Sacred Heart of Jesus, Our Lady of Good Counsel
South Sudan
Archdiocese of Juba — St. Therese of Lisieux
United Republic of Tanzania
Archdiocese of Arusha — St. Therese of Lisieux
Archdiocese of Dar-es-Salaam — St. Joseph the Worker
Archdiocese of Tabora — St. Teresa of Calcutta
Zimbabwe
Archdiocese of Bulawayo — Immaculate Heart of Mary
Archdiocese of Harare — St. Peter Claver

Extraterrestrial locations

See also

 Patron saints of ailments, illness, and dangers
 Patron saints of occupations and activities
 Patronage of the Blessed Virgin Mary
 Patron day

References

www.usccb.org/bible/readings/120814.cfm
 

Places
Lists of saints by place